Al Tadhamon SC, or Al Tadamon is a Kuwaiti professional football club based in Al Farwaniya.

Honours
Kuwaiti Division One
Champions (4): 1966–67, 1973–74, 1985–86, 2020–21

Current squad

References

Tadhamon
Tadhamon
Tadhamon
Tadhamon
Tadhamon